Andrzej Mańka (born 18 April 1967) is a Polish politician. He was elected to the Sejm on 25 September 2005, getting 10,646 votes in 6 Lublin district as a candidate from the League of Polish Families list.

He was also a member of Sejm 2001-2005. Recently he has joined the political party Right of the Republic.

See also
Members of Polish Sejm 2005-2007

External links
Andrzej Mańka - parliamentary page - includes declarations of interest, voting record, and transcripts of speeches.

1967 births
Living people
Politicians from Lublin
Members of the Polish Sejm 2005–2007
Members of the Polish Sejm 2001–2005
League of Polish Families politicians
Right Wing of the Republic politicians